is a Japanese singer-songwriter.

Biography 
Abe started learning the piano from age three, and from junior high school she wanted to be a singer. She gave up the piano in favour of the guitar, wanting to be an acoustic pop singer/songwriter in the style of Canadian pop musician Avril Lavigne. While at high school she frequently busked and attended music auditions. In February 2006, on a morning when she had truanted from school, she wrote her first song, "My Baby". Late in mid-2006, she entered the Yamaha Teens' Music Festival's Ōita regional contest on the recommendation of a musical instrument store manager, and performed "My Baby". She won the grand prize, and later entered the country-wide version, where she won an honourable mention prize after performing .

After finishing high school, she moved to Tokyo and was signed to the record label Pony Canyon. Abe performed at many live events, including some high-profile events like the Rock in Japan Festival. From August until November, four acoustic demos of Abe songs were released on iTunes. The third of these, "My Baby", was chosen as the October iTunes Single of the Week free download song.

Abe released her first album Free in January 2009. The eponymous title track was released as a radio single, and did extremely well on radio stations: Abe reached #1 on the Billboard Japan Hot 100 chart, despite only the airplay component counting towards her ranking (as opposed to airplay and physical sales, like most other releases).

Since the album, she has released three singles, the first two reaching the top 20 on the Oricon single charts. The third, "Itsu no Hi mo", reached #2 on the Japan Hot 100 chart, a week before the physical release of the single. The single was followed by her second album, Pop, which was her first top 5 album on the Oricon albums chart.

Discography

Studio albums

Compilation albums

Live albums

Singles

As a lead artist

As a featured artist

Promotional singles

Video albums

Tours 
 Abe Mao Live No. 0 (2009)
 Abe Mao Live No. 0.7 (2009)
 Abe Mao Live No. 1 (2010)
 Abe Mao Live No. 2 (2010)
 Abe Mao Live Natsu no Jin (2011)
 Abe Mao Live No. 3: Zepp to Quattro Dake de Gomen ne Tour (2011)
 Abe Mao Live No. 4 (2012)
 Abe Mao Hikigatari Live 2012 Fuyu: Christmas da yo! Kuru desho? Kuru yo ne!? no Maki (2012)
 Abe Mao Hikigatari Live 2013 Natsu (2013)
 Abe Mao Live No. 5 (2013)
 5th Anniversary Abe Mao Live "Ochikarazoe, Negaimasu." Tour 2014 (2014)
 5th Anniversary Abe Mao Live 2014 @ Nippon Budōkan (2014)

Notes

References

External links 
 Mao Abe Official Site 
 Pony Canyon Official Label Site 

1990 births
Living people
Japanese women pop singers
Japanese women singer-songwriters
Japanese singer-songwriters
Musicians from Ōita Prefecture
People from Ōita (city)
Pony Canyon artists
21st-century Japanese women singers
21st-century Japanese singers